The Spinning Ball (German: Die rollende Kugel) is a 1927 German silent film directed by Erich Schönfelder and starring Edda Croy, Harry Liedtke and Erna Morena. It was shot at the Staaken Studios in Berlin.

Cast
Edda Croy as Maerid Ragvind  
Harry Liedtke as Robert von Landivis  
Erna Morena as Marquise de St. Dourdan  
Jean Bradin as Pierre Grenville  
Adele Sandrock as Princess Seljawtschina  
Paul Otto as Marquis de St. Dourdan  
Helen von Münchofen as lady  
Alice Kempen as Zofe 
Borwin Walth as secretary

References

External links

Films of the Weimar Republic
Films directed by Erich Schönfelder
German silent feature films
German black-and-white films
Films set in Monaco
Films shot at Staaken Studios